Frank Fenton may refer to:
Frank Fenton (actor) (1906–1957), American stage, film and television actor
Frank Fenton (writer) (1903–1971), English-born American writer